Ever since 1944, the Social Democrats had held the mayor's position in Hvidovre Municipality. 

In the 2017 election, the Social Democrats had won 8 seats and become the largest party. Helle Moesgaard Adelborg would eventually become mayor for her 2nd full term.

In this election, once again it would be the Social Democrats who won the most seats, despite losing a seat. However, the Conservatives, the Green Left, Venstre, the Red–Green Alliance and local party Hvidovrelisten reached an agreement without the Social Democrats. This would see Anders Wolf Andresen from the Green Left secure the mayor's position.  

This was 1 of only 2 municipalities in the 2017 elections where the Green Left would win the mayor's position.

Electoral system
For elections to Danish municipalities, a number varying from 9 to 31 are chosen to be elected to the municipal council. The seats are then allocated using the D'Hondt method and a closed list proportional representation.
Hvidovre Municipality had 21 seats in 2021

Unlike in Danish General Elections, in elections to municipal councils, electoral alliances are allowed.

Electoral alliances  

Electoral Alliance 1

Electoral Alliance 2

Electoral Alliance 3

Results

Notes

References 

Hvidovre